The Memphis Americans were a soccer team based out of Memphis, Tennessee that played in the original Major Indoor Soccer League (MISL).  They played from 1981 to 1984.  Their home arena was the Mid-South Coliseum.

A new version of the team will play in 2021 at Landers Center in Southaven, Mississippi, a suburb of Memphis.

History
In May 1981, the Christian group Athletes in Action, headed by former stand out soccer player Kyle Rote, Jr., purchased the financially troubled MISL team then known as the Hartford Hellions and moved the team to Memphis.  The team, renamed the Americans, played in Memphis through the end of the 1984 season before relocating to  Las Vegas, but retained the name "Americans".

The team's first coach was German Horst Bertl, who was an experienced player and coach from the Bundesliga, but new to indoor soccer. In the later years to save money the team's general manager, Kyle Rote Jr, would coach the team.

The team was primarily stocked with talented foreign players such as Tony Carbognani, Helmut Dudek and Stan Stamenkovic. Some Hartford players came with the franchise to Memphis, including Thomas Nevers, Hank Liotart and Bruce Rudroff.  The Memphis franchise added young Americans like number one draft choice Mike Garrett and Steve Allison along with more experienced pros to round out the first year roster.  The team was very competitive and finished at just under .500 in the first season.

The team had good attendance at the Mid-South Coliseum – averaging around 7,000 per game in the 10,000 arena – but expectations were higher and even as they entered year two there was some expectation that the ownership needed to do better. A new group of owners were added shortly after that and included local owners that would provide more attention to franchise operations.  In year two the team continued to compete at around .500 and play attractive soccer.  After the end of their third season, the team was moved to Las Vegas – where they only lasted one additional year.

Several Memphis players continued to play professionally after the Memphis team were Carbognani (MISL) and National Professional Soccer League (NPSL), Stamenkovic, Kunovac, Garrett (NPSL player coach with Toledo and Kalamazoo) and Dudek.  The team was very entertaining and talented – Stamenkovic dubbed "The Magician" for his ball handling skills was amazing to see in action and the best-known of the players on the team.  Dudek was a strong defender but was most noticed because he had such a powerful shot.  Garrett was a young American with great skills and Carbognani was very good at passing and controlling the ball.  Richard But was the primary goalkeeper and had some great games. Bill Mishalow was the backup goalkeeper who was formidable in his own right. Art Hughes a native of Memphis was also  an asset on the field and off. Hughes dubbed "The Denier" for his ability to block shots was also used off the field as ambassador to the Memphis City Schools and helped establish the school systems inaugural soccer programs.

The Americans average attendance in Memphis was 5,763 in their three years before moving to Las Vegas and becoming the Las Vegas Americans.

Resurrection and new league
In April 2021, a new version of the Memphis Americans were announced as charter members of the newly-created version of the National Indoor Soccer League (not to be confused with what would become the third incarnation of the Major Indoor Soccer League.)  The new team has adopted the history of the original franchise and joins the charter  Fayetteville Fury and Columbus Rapids.    On April 29, 2021, the Americans were officially announced as a charter team in the new NISL to field both men's and women's teams.

Coaches &  players

Coaches
 Horst Bertl
 Kyle Rote, Jr.

Players
 Gary Allison (1983–84)
 Steve Allison (1981–84)
 Richard But (1981–84)
 Tony Carbognani (1981–82) 43 Apps 39 Goals
 Steve Doerr  (1981–1984) 100 Apps 17 Goals
 Helmut Dudek (1981–82) 43 Apps 34 Goals
 Jorge Espinoza (1981–84)
 Mike Garrett (1981–1983) 57 Apps 5 Goals
  Fred Grgurev (1983–84) 50 Apps 42 Goals
 Bernd Holzenbein (1983–84)
 Art Hughes (1982–84) 101 App 79 Goals
 Helmut Kremers (1981–82) 14 Apps 13 Goals
 Hank Liotart (1981–82) 39 Apps 8 Goals
 Bill Mishalow (1981–84)
 Thomas Nevers (1981-82) 35 Apps 7 Goals
 Yilmaz Orhan (1983–84) 47 Apps 49 Goals
 Bruce Rudroff
 Derek Smethurst (1981–82) 33 Apps 35 Goals
  Stan Stamenkovic (1981–83) 77 Apps 101 Goals
 Matt O'Sullivan (1981–84) 107 Apps 11 Goals

References

http://www.soccer-archives.com/year/1982.html
http://www.soccer-archives.com/year/1983.html
http://www.soccer-archives.com/year/1984.html
http://www.nationalsoccerteams.com/v2/club.php?id=7255&year=1983&rythm=1

External links
MemphisAmericans.com (original website)

Defunct indoor soccer clubs in the United States
Americans
Major Indoor Soccer League (1978–1992) teams
Soccer clubs in Tennessee
1981 establishments in Tennessee
1984 establishments in Tennessee
Association football clubs established in 1981
Association football clubs disestablished in 1984